The 2009–10 MHL season was the first season of the Junior Hockey League, the junior ice hockey league in Russia. The Steel Foxes Magnitogorsk won the league title.

Regular season

Western Conference

Eastern Conference

Playoffs

External links
 Season on hockeyarchives.info

3
Junior Hockey League (Russia) seasons